The 1918 Alabama Crimson Tide baseball team represented the Alabama Crimson Tide of the University of Alabama in the 1918 NCAA baseball season, winning the SIAA championship. Lena Styles was on the team.

Schedule and results

References

Alabama Crimson Tide
Alabama Crimson Tide baseball seasons
Southern Intercollegiate Athletic Association baseball champion seasons
1918 in sports in Alabama